Derinda Township is one of twenty-three townships in Jo Daviess County, Illinois, USA.  As of the 2010 census, its population was 321 and it contained 176 housing units.

Derinda Township was named in the 1850s for Derinda Barr, the wife of an early settler.

Geography

Adjacent townships
 Woodbine Township (north)
 Stockton Township (northeast)
 Pleasant Valley Township (east)
 Woodland Township, Carroll County (southeast)
 Washington Township, Carroll County (south)
 Hanover Township (west)
 Elizabeth Township (northwest)

Cemeteries
The township contains these four cemeteries: Albright/Fehler, Massbach/St. John's Evangelical Lutheran, Trinity Lutheran/Derinda Center, and Morrison/Derinda Methodist.

Demographics

School districts
 River Ridge Community Unit School District 210
 Stockton Community Unit School District 206
 West Carroll Community Unit School District 314

Political districts
 Illinois' 16th congressional district
 State House District 89
 State Senate District 45

References
 
 United States Census Bureau 2007 TIGER/Line Shapefiles
 United States National Atlas

External links
 Jo Daviess County official site
 City-Data.com
 Illinois State Archives
 Township Officials of Illinois

Townships in Jo Daviess County, Illinois
Townships in Illinois